The 23rd running of the women's Flèche wallonne was originally planned on 22 April 2020, but was rescheduled to 30 September 2020 due to the COVID-19 pandemic. The race started and finished in Huy. The route featured seven categorized climbs, including two ascents of the Mur de Huy. The finish line was on the top of the final ascent of the Mur. For the first time in its 23-year history, the women's race was broadcast live. The organisation provided almost an hour of live coverage. 

The race was won for the sixth consecutive time by Dutch rider Anna van der Breggen.

Route
The race started and finished in Huy, following a similar route as the 2019 race. The final 32 km loop was covered twice, totalling 124 km.

There were 7 categorised climbs:
45 km: Côte de Warre - 2.2 km climb at 4.9%
72.5 km: Côte d'Ereffe - 2.1 km climb at 5%
82 km: Côte de Cherave - 1.3 km climb at 8.1%
92 km: Mur de Huy - 1.3 km climb at 9.6%
104.5 km: Côte d'Ereffe - 2.1 km climb at 5%
114 km: Côte de Cherave - 1.3 km climb at 8.1%
124 km: Mur de Huy - 1.3 km climb at 9.6%

Teams
Eight UCI Women's WorldTeams and sixteen UCI Women's Continental Teams competed.

UCI Women's WorldTeams

 
 
 
 
 
 
 
 

UCI Women's Continental Teams

Result

See also
 2020 in women's road cycling

References

La Fleche Wallonne Feminine
La Flèche Wallonne Feminine
La Fleche Wallonne Feminine